Early general elections were held in Morocco on 25 November 2011, brought forward from 2012 and then postponed from 7 October 2011.

Public protests as part of the Arab Spring in February 2011 led King Mohammed VI to announce an early election, a process of constitutional reform granting new civil rights, and the relinquishing of some of his administrative powers. Following a referendum on 1 July 2011, the new constitution was ratified on 13 September.

Of the Lower House of Parliament's 395 seats, 305 were elected from party lists in 92 constituencies and the additional 90 seats were elected from a national list, with two thirds reserved for women and the remaining third reserved for men under the age of 40.

30 parties participated in the elections, 18 of which gained seats. The vast majority of seats was won by three political groups: the moderate Islamist Justice and Development Party (PJD); an eight-party "Coalition for Democracy" (led by the RNI) headed by Morocco's incumbent minister of finance Salaheddine Mezouar; and the Koutla ("Coalition") alliance of the incumbent prime minister Abbas El Fassi.

Results of the election, in terms of numbers of seats won by each party, were announced on 27 November 2011. But no voting figures of any kind were released, and still had not been by the end of 2011. This was in contrast with the 2007 elections, for which voting figures were released by the Interior Ministry. The official turnout was 45%, but some comments suggested it was much lower.

The Justice and Development party won 107 seats, giving it the largest parliamentary representation, although not a majority. According to the new constitution, this made its leader, Abdelillah Benkirane, prime minister.

Background

2007 parliamentary elections

The 2007 parliamentary elections were the second of King Mohammed VI's reign. They were characterized by a relatively low turnout of 37%, 15 points down from that of 2002 (52%). The Socialist Union of Popular Forces (USFP) - the largest party in the outgoing government - unexpectedly lost 12 of its seats. The Istiqlal Party came first with 52 seats, ahead of the Justice and Development Party with 46, despite the latter coming first in terms of number of votes. A coalition  of five parties (Istiqlal, Popular movement, National rally of independents, Party of Progress and Socialism and Socialist Union of Popular Forces) with a narrow combined majority in the House of Representatives formed a government headed by Abbas El Fassi, the president of the Istiqlal party.

Arab Spring and protest movement

Following national protests held in early February 2011 in solidarity with the Egyptian revolution, a youth group (later known as the 20 February movement) and the Islamist organization Al Adl Wa Al Ihssane called for a day of protests. Among the demands of the organisers was that the constitutional role of the king should be "reduced to its natural size". On 20 February, several thousands of people participated in demonstrations across Morocco. On 26 February, a further protest was held in Casablanca. Further protests were held in Casablanca and Rabat on 20 March.

On 9 March, King Mohammed announced that he would form a commission to work on constitutional revisions, which would make proposals to him by June, after which a referendum would be held on the draft constitution.

2011 Constitutional reforms

A committee representing various parties was tasked by the king to prepare the new constitution. A draft was published in early June 2011. A referendum for its adoption was conducted on 1 July 2011  and registered a record high participation rate with a 70% turnout; the reforms were passed with 98% approval. The protest movement however, previously called for a boycott of the referendum. Consequently, the date of the parliamentary election was brought forward from September 2012 to October 2011.

The new constitution, entered into effect on 1 August 2011, created a number of new civil rights, including constitutional guarantees of freedom of expression, social equality for women, rights for speakers of minority languages and the independence of judges.

Changes to electoral and administrative law were also significant. The king rescinded his power to appoint prime ministers, obliging himself to appoint a member of the party winning the most seats in a parliamentary election. The office of prime minister, in turn, was given additional powers to appoint senior civil servants and diplomats, in consultation with the king's ministerial council. The prime minister replaced the king as the head of government and chair of the government council, gaining the power to dissolve parliament.

The voting system was also changed so that the number of parliamentary seats decided on a constituency basis was increased from 295 to 305. Additional seats were reserved for election from national party lists, 60 consisting only of female candidates and 30 for male candidates under the age of 40.

Election timetable
After negotiations between the interior ministry, which oversees elections, and some 20 political parties, the government proposed that parliamentary elections should be moved to 11 November, with the possibility of shifting it due to its proximity to the Islamic holiday of Eid al-Adha. In the end, the election was held on 25 November 2011. The electoral campaign took place from 12 to 24 November.

There were fears that a low voter turnout, already traditionally a problem, would be further exacerbated by a boycott call by the pro-reform February 20 movement and the Islamist organization Al Adl Wa Al Ihssane, who felt that the constitutional reforms were insufficient.

Electoral system
The election follows the closed list proportional representation system (with a 6 percent threshold) using the largest remainder method. Voting is conducted through universal suffrage in secret ballots.

There are two types of list, local and national. 305 seats are allocated for the local lists spread over 92 electoral districts, while the national list consists of 90 seats, putting the total number of deputies at 395 - 70 more than the last election.

The national list consists of a 60 seats list reserved for women and another of 30 seats for candidates under 40. The list follows the same proportional representation system but on the level of the country.

Eligibility
All Moroccan citizens are eligible for voting if they are at least 18 years old and have their civil and political rights unrestrained by a court order. A person is eligible for candidacy if they fulfil the conditions set out in the law regulating parliament (law 27.11 articles 6 to 10), according to which the following are ineligible:

People who are ineligible to vote
People who have acquired the Moroccan citizenship less than 5 years before the voting date.
People who, on the voting date, are subjected to a national court sentence forbidding them from exercising political life. As long as the sentence is still into effect or not currently under appeal.
People who, on the voting date, are either incarcerated or subjected to a suspended prison sentence, regardless of the duration.
People who currently (or retired less than a year before the voting date) hold the following positions: Judges, provincial governors, Caids, Pashas, Khalifas, Moqadems, military, auxiliary forces, provincial directors of the ministry of the Interior, Inspectors of the ministry of the Interior, public financing inspectors, presidents of electoral districts, the general bailiff of the state, the regional bailiffs.
People who previously held the positions mentioned above - in a region they are running in - but retired less than two years before the voting date. This condition additionally applies to police officers.
People who currently (or retired less than a year before the voting date) hold the following positions (in the region they are running in): Directors of public institutions, CEOs of companies where the state holds more than 30% shares, presidents of provincial or regional ministerial bureaus.
People who exercised a public function - in the region they are running in - that required them to carry a firearm during their work and have not retired more than a year before the voting date. Regardless of the nature, duration or remuneration of their mission.

Campaign

Participating parties
A total of 30 parties proposed candidates in the election while three far-left parties - the communist "Talia", the Unified Socialist Party and the "Nahj Ad-Dimuqrati" - called for a boycott. The Islamist organization Al Adl Wa Al Ihssane and the 20 February protest movement also called for a boycott.

Istiqlal was the only party that filled a list for every constituency. The Justice and Development Party  and the Socialist Union of Popular Forces both fielded 393 candidates.

Source:

Major competing parties

The main contestants in the election were three political formations : the moderate Islamist Justice and Development Party (PJD), headed by Salé's deputy Abdelillah Benkirane; the "Coalition for Democracy" which is an alliance headed by Morocco's current minister of finance Salaheddine Mezouar; and the Koutla alliance of the incumbent prime minister Abbas El Fassi

The Coalition for Democracy was formed on 10 October 2011 and groups eight parties: the National Rally of Independents, the Popular Movement, the Constitutional Union, the Authenticity and Modernity Party (PAM), the Labour Party, the Green Left Party, the Party of Renaissance and Virtue and the Socialist Party.

The Koutla groups three parties which are members of the 2007-2011 government; namely the Istiqlal Party, the Socialist Union of Popular Forces and the Party of Progress and Socialism. The Koutla alliance criticized the decision of two other member parties of the current government to join the Coalition for Democracy alliance with other parties of the opposition. Consequently, the leaders of the Koutla made implicit calls for the Justice and Development party to join their alliance.
   

The below table lists the most prominent parties in the Moroccan political scene (bold indicates members of the 2007-2011 government):

(*): Was formed after the 2007 elections.
(**): Joint list of the National Democratic Party and Al Ahd
(***): Joint list of the National Congress Party, the Democratic Socialist Vanguard Party and the Unified Socialist Party

Results
The spokesman of the ministry of the interior announced on the evening of Friday 25 November that the turnout in the election was 45%, up 8 points from that of 2007. By the time of the initial results on 26 November, covering 288 of the 395 seats being contested, it had become clear that the Justice and Development Party had secured a plurality. It had secured 80 seats by this stage, with Istiqlal having secured 45. News organizations speculated that the Justice and Development Party would govern in coalition with several left-wing political parties.

Names of successful candidates were announced on 27 November 2011. The Justice and Development Party won a plurality of seats, making its leader, Abdelillah Benkirane, prime minister designate under the rules of the new constitution. "This is a clear victory," he said,"but we will need alliances in order to work together".

By coalition

Government formation
The Justice and Development party is expected to ally with the Koutla and form a government that will be likely headed by Abdelillah Benkirane or Saadeddine Othmani, who are respectively the current and former party leaders. Benkirane held talks with the King on the evening of 28 November, and declared that he is not going to announce an alliance before the prime minister is appointed. He has previously stated that he is open to an alliance with the Koutla and made positive signs towards it.

After the announcement of the final results, some leaders of the Coalition for Democracy stated that they have no reason to still maintain the alliance.  Mohand Laenser of the Popular Movement and representatives from the Constitutional Union said that they were discussing whether to stay or retract from the coalition. Salaheddine Mezouar of the National Rally of Independents, and Mohamed Cheikh Biadillah, leader of the Authenticity and Modernity Party, said that they choose not to participate in the upcoming government.

On Tuesday 29 November 2011, as expected, Abdelilah Benkirane was nominated by the king as the new prime minister.

Soumia Benkhaldoun was appointed Minister Delegate to the Minister of Higher Education, Scientific Research and Executive Training.

On 9 July 2013, Istiqlal's six ministers resigned from the cabinet over subsidy reforms.

References

External links
Official website of the elections (Arabic)

2011–2012 Moroccan protests
Morocco
Elections in Morocco
2011 in Morocco
Election and referendum articles with incomplete results